Kay Maree Goldsworthy  (born 1956) is an Australian bishop of the Anglican Church of Australia. She is the current archbishop of Perth in the Province of Western Australia. Upon her installation as archbishop, on 10 February 2018, she became the first female archbishop in the Anglican Church of Australia.  Previously, she served as diocesan bishop of the Diocese of Gippsland in the south-eastern Australian state of Victoria.

Early life, education and ministry
Goldsworthy was born and raised in Melbourne, where she studied theology at Trinity College from 1980 to 1983. In 1986 she was ordained as one of the Anglican church's first female deacons in Australia and served as curate at parishes in Thomastown/Epping and Deer Park/St. Albans before moving to Western Australia to become school chaplain at Perth College in Mount Lawley. In 1992 she was ordained as one of a group of Australia's first female priests by the then archbishop, Peter Carnley.  She served as rector of St David's parish, Applecross from 1995 to 2006. During this time she was appointed a canon of St George's Cathedral and subsequently Archdeacon of Fremantle. In 2007 she was appointed Archdeacon of Perth and the registrar of the Diocese of Perth.

Ministry as bishop
In April 2008, Goldsworthy was chosen to become an assistant bishop in the Diocese of Perth by the archbishop, Roger Herft. She became the first woman to be consecrated as a bishop in the Anglican Church of Australia at St George's Cathedral, Perth, on 22 May 2008.
In 2013 she became the first woman already consecrated as a bishop, and the second Anglican woman, to be on a nomination list for election as a diocesan bishop in Australia (the Bishop of Newcastle election being the first).
On 11 December 2014 she was elected to become the diocesan bishop of the Diocese of Gippsland and was installed on 21 March 2015.
In the  Australian 2017 Queen's Birthday Honours List, Goldsworthy was appointed an Officer of the Order of Australia (AO) for "distinguished service to religion through the Anglican Church of Australia, as a pioneer and role model for women, to church administration, and to pastoral care and equality".

Goldsworthy has said that she supports an "inclusive" approach to same-sex marriage. She revealed in an interview that she voted in favour of same-sex marriage during Australia's plebiscite. As a bishop in Gippsland, she appointed an openly gay priest in a same-sex partnership. She has also ordained an openly gay man in a civil partnership. In 2022, during the Lambeth Conference, she signed a statement in support of LGBTQ inclusion within the Anglican Communion.

Controversy at time of appointment
Women have served as Anglican bishops in a number of countries, including the United States, Canada and New Zealand, since 1989.

In September 2007, the Australian church's appellate tribunal ruled that there was no constitutional impediment to women becoming bishops, but agreed to defer any appointments until 2008.  The report of the appellate tribunal considered the following questions:
Question 1: Is there anything in the Constitution which would now prevent the consecration of a woman in priest's orders as a bishop in this Church in a diocese which by ordinance has adopted the Law of the Church of England Clarification Canon 1992?
Answer: As regards diocesan bishops: No, provided that the woman has been duly elected as the diocesan bishop and has had her election duly confirmed in accordance with the criteria for canonical fitness set out in s74(1) of the Constitution.

A subsequent bishops' conference, in Newcastle, New South Wales, in April 2008, cleared the way for the first consecration of a woman as a bishop in Australia.

Goldsworthy's appointment was opposed on conscientious grounds from some sections of the church, particularly in the Diocese of Sydney led by its then archbishop, Peter Jensen. The Sydney diocese  indicated that if Goldsworthy visited in an official capacity she would be unable to perform any duties as a bishop and could only act as a deacon. David Mulready, then bishop of the Diocese of North West Australia, said "I come from a part of the Anglican Church that takes the Bible seriously and believes that the Bible prohibits what is about to happen ... I think it's novel, I think it's provocative, I think it's divisive and the archbishop knows all of that."

See also

Ordination of women in the Anglican Communion

References

External links

 Official announcement of Goldsworthy's appointment as a bishop
 

1955 births
Living people
Women Anglican bishops
People educated at Trinity College (University of Melbourne)
Assistant bishops in the Anglican Diocese of Perth
Anglican archbishops of Perth
21st-century Anglican archbishops
21st-century Anglican bishops in Australia
Anglican bishops of Gippsland
Officers of the Order of Australia
Archdeacons of Perth, WA
University of Divinity alumni